Patrick Zipfel (born October 15, 1967) is an American basketball coach and former college athletics director. He is currently an assistant coach and advance scout for the Phoenix Suns of the National Basketball Association (NBA). Zipfel worked as  assistant coach/advance scout for the Chicago Bulls(NBA)as well as the Minnesota Timberwolves. In October 2015, Zipfel accepted an interim coaching position at Mansfield University, located in Mansfield, Pennsylvania to help restore the program.

Early years
Zipfel earned a bachelor’s degree from Cabrini College in English/communications in 1989.

Coaching career
Zipfel was an assistant men’s basketball coach at NCAA Division I The Citadel from 1989 to 1992. He was awarded his first head coaching job at Bucks County Community College in 1993. In 1994, Zipfel moved on to Centenary College of New Jersey, where he served as their director of athletics and head men’s basketball coach.

He worked for the NBA’s Los Angeles Clippers as an advance scout, responsible for scouting the Clippers’ upcoming opponents and preparing game plans for coaches and players.

Zipfel spent the 2003-04 season as head coach of the New Jersey Squires of the American Basketball Association, leading the Squires into the quarterfinals, where they were defeated by the Kansas City Knights.

From 2004 to 2007, he was an advance scout for the NBA’s Portland Trail Blazers.

From 2007 to 2011, Zipfel was an assistant coach and advance scout for the NBA’s Houston Rockets.
 
Houston General Manager Daryl Morey said Zipfel was a “secret weapon” in the Rockets’ first-round playoff series victory in 2009, their first playoff series win in more than a decade. “We felt like we were a little tick ahead because we had Pat Zipfel on the bench,” said Morey.

Zipfel spent the summer of 2011 serving as the advance scout for the Ukraine National Team under head coach Mike Fratello.

On December 6, 2011 he was hired by the Minnesota Timberwolves as an assistant coach and advance scout.

In Summer of 2012 Zipfel served as the Dominican Republic national basketball team advance scout under head coach John Calipari for this country’s Olympic entrant for Men’s Basketball. The team won a gold medal in Centro Basket, and lost in the pre-Olympic Qualifying tournament.

Zipfel has been called “one of the sharpest strategic minds in the NBA.” ESPN.com says Zipfel’s NBA peers rate him “one of the league's best” advanced scouts.

He currently serves on the NBA Coaches Association technology committee.

References 

https://www.nba.com/suns/directory/staff#

1967 births
American men's basketball coaches
Cabrini University alumni
College men's basketball head coaches in the United States
Centenary Cyclones athletic directors
The Citadel Bulldogs basketball coaches
Houston Rockets assistant coaches
Junior college men's basketball coaches in the United States
Los Angeles Clippers assistant coaches
Minnesota Timberwolves assistant coaches
Portland Trail Blazers assistant coaches
Living people